John Bromfield (born Farron Bromfield; June 11, 1922 – September 19, 2005) was an American actor and commercial fisherman.

Early years
Farron Bromfield was born in South Bend, Indiana. He played football and was a boxing champion at Saint Mary's College of California, where he also lettered in football, baseball, track and swimming. In the 1940s, he gained his first acting experience at the La Jolla Playhouse.

Military service 
Bromfield served in the United States Navy in World War II.

Film 
Bromfield's screen debut came in Harpoon (1948). The same year, he was cast as a detective in Sorry, Wrong Number, starring Burt Lancaster and Barbara Stanwyck for Paramount Pictures. In 1953, Bromfield appeared with Esther Williams, Van Johnson and Tony Martin in Easy to Love. 

He also starred in horror films, including the 1955 3D production Revenge of the Creature, one of the Creature from the Black Lagoon sequels.

Television 
In the middle 1950s, Bromfield appeared in westerns, such as NBC's Frontier anthology series in the role of a sheriff in the episode "The Hanging at Thunder Butte Creek". 

In 1956, Bromfield was cast as law enforcement officer Frank Morgan in the syndicated western-themed  crime drama series The Sheriff of Cochise, and in its spinoff, U.S. Marshal. The real sheriff of Cochise County at the time, Jack Howard, visited the set when the program began and made Bromfield an honorary deputy. Bromfield once told  The Los Angeles Times: "About 40 million see 'Sheriff of Cochise' or 'U.S. Marshal' every week. I'd have to do about twenty-five pictures, major pictures, over a span of eight or nine years for enough people to see me in the theater who see me in one week on 'U.S. Marshal'... The show is seen all over the world. Television is a fabulous medium." The series was actually created by his co-star Stan Jones, who appeared in twenty-four segments as Deputy Harry Olson.

Later years 
In 1960, Bromfield retired from acting to produce sports shows and work as a commercial fisherman off Newport Beach, California.

Personal life 
Bromfield married Grace Landis while in college. They later divorced. He married actress Corinne Calvet in Boulder, Colorado, in 1948. They were divorced March 16, 1954. He also was divorced from actress/dancer Larri Thomas. He and his fourth wife, actress/dancer and author Mary Ellen Bromfield, were married 43 years.

Death
Bromfield died September 18, 2005, at age 83 from renal failure in Palm Desert, California.

Filmography

See also

 Horror films

References

External links

John Bromfield website, johnbromfield.com; accessed May 15, 2015
John Bromfield profile, BriansDriveinTheater.com; accessed May 15, 2015
The Colt Revolver in the American West—John Bromfield's Official Police Model

1922 births
2005 deaths
American male film actors
American male television actors
Deaths from kidney failure
Male actors from Indiana
Actors from South Bend, Indiana
People from Palm Desert, California
Male Western (genre) film actors
United States Navy sailors
Burials at Forest Lawn Memorial Park (Glendale)
20th-century American male actors
United States Navy personnel of World War II